Pilatus may refer to:

People
 Pontius Pilate (Latin: Pontius Pilatus, died 39 AD), Roman governor of Judea
 Leontius Pilatus (died 1366), Greek Calabrian scholar
 Rob Pilatus (1965–1998), artist and member of group Milli Vanilli

Other uses
 Pilatus (mountain) (2128m a.s.l.), next to Lucerne in Switzerland
 PILATUS (detector), an X-ray area detector developed at the Swiss Light Source
 Pilatus (play), a 1917 play by Kaj Munk
 Pilatus Aircraft, a Swiss aircraft manufacturer
 Radio Pilatus, a private radio station of Central Switzerland
 Pilatus Railway, a mountain railway in Switzerland

See also
 
 Pilat (disambiguation)
 Pilate (disambiguation)
 Pilates, physical fitness system
 Pilati (disambiguation)

als:Pilatus
ro:Pilat